Walter Bernard Langley (April 7, 1921 – September 3, 1976) was an American lawyer and politician from New York.

Life
He was born on April 7, 1921, in Amsterdam, Montgomery County, New York. There he attended St. Mary's Institute. He graduated B.B.A. from Niagara University in 1943. During World War II, he served as a first lieutenant in the U.S. Army. He graduated from New York University School of Law, was admitted to the bar, practiced law in Albany, and entered politics as a Republican. On May 23, 1964, he married Harriet Frances Shaughnessy,

Langley was a member of the New York State Senate from 1969 to 1974, sitting in the 178th, 179th and 180th New York State Legislatures.

He died on September 3, 1976, at his home in Albany, New York.

References

1921 births
1976 deaths
People from Amsterdam, New York
Politicians from Albany, New York
Republican Party New York (state) state senators
Niagara University alumni
United States Army officers
New York University School of Law alumni
20th-century American politicians
Lawyers from Albany, New York
Military personnel from New York (state)
20th-century American lawyers
United States Army personnel of World War II